In sociology, the third place refers to the social surroundings that are separate from the two usual social environments of home ("first place") and the workplace ("second place"). Examples of third places include churches, cafes, clubs, public libraries, gyms, bookstores, stoops and parks. In his book The Great Good Place (1989), Ray Oldenburg argues that third places are important for civil society, democracy, civic engagement, and establishing feelings of a sense of place.

Robert Putnam addressed issues related to third place, but without using the term, in Bowling Alone: America's Declining Social Capital (1995, 2000).

Oldenburg's characteristics 
Oldenburg calls one's "first place" the home and the people the person lives with. The "second place" is the workplace—where people may actually spend most of their time. Third places, then, are "anchors" of community life and facilitate and foster broader, more creative interaction. In other words, "your third place is where you relax in public, where you encounter familiar faces and make new acquaintances."

Other scholars have summarized Oldenburg's view of a third place with eight characteristics:

Neutral ground
 Occupants of third places have little to no obligation to be there. They are not tied down to the area financially, politically, legally, or otherwise and are free to come and go as they please.
 Leveler (a leveling place)
 Third places put no importance on an individual's status in a society. One's socioeconomic status does not matter in a third place, allowing for a sense of commonality among its occupants. There are no prerequisites or requirements that would prevent acceptance or participation in the third place.
 Conversation is the main activity
 Playful and happy conversation is the main focus of activity in third places, although it is not required to be the only activity. The tone of conversation is usually light-hearted and humorous; wit and good-natured playfulness are highly valued.
 Accessibility and accommodation
 Third places must be open and readily accessible to those who occupy them. They must also be accommodating, meaning they provide for the wants of their inhabitants, and all occupants feel their needs have been fulfilled.
 The regulars
 Third places harbor a number of regulars that help give the space its tone, and help set the mood and characteristics of the area. Regulars to third places also attract newcomers, and are there to help someone new to the space feel welcome and accommodated.
 A low profile
 Third places are characteristically wholesome. The inside of a third place is without extravagance or grandiosity, and has a homely feel. Third places are never snobby or pretentious, and are accepting of all types of individuals, from various different walks of life.
 The mood is playful
 The tone of conversation in third places is never marked with tension or hostility. Instead, third places have a playful nature, where witty conversation and frivolous banter are not only common, but highly valued.
 A home away from home
 Occupants of third places will often have the same feelings of warmth, possession, and belonging as they would in their own homes. They feel a piece of themselves is rooted in the space, and gain spiritual regeneration by spending time there.

Types
One of the criteria for the third place, according to Jeffres et al. (2009), is that it "offers stress relief from the everyday demands of both home and work. It provides the feeling of inclusiveness and belonging associated with participating in a group’s social activities, without the rigidity of policy or exclusiveness of club or organization membership".

In their research many types of environments were listed as possible third places. These included community centers like YM/WCAs; senior centers; shopping centers like coffee shops, malls, and barber shops; religious places; schools; outdoor recreative activities (parks, neighborhood parties); and various media such as the World Wide Web and newspapers.

The concept of a "third place" has been picked up by various small businesses, including as a name for various locally owned coffee shops, and is commonly cited in urban planning literature on the issue of community-oriented business development and public space.

As the concept of "third place" has become more popular, several coworking office spaces have embraced this concept as the basis of their interior design.

Variant forms of the concept include the "community coffee house" and the "community living room," a term which has been adopted by several organizations to describe the model of a cooperatively-run "third space" which includes commercial or non-commercial functions with an emphasis on providing a free space for social interaction.

The general store or pub and occasionally bookstore or diner are traditional variants of the concept, provided in such cases there is an emphasis on expectation of socialization, and customers are invited to stay and "hang out" with or without making any (or additional) purchases. Institutions which traditionally provided some functions of a third place included shared leisure facilities such as a bowling alley or arcade, function halls, lodges or social clubs, when and if facilities were available for casual use.

A church community fills this role for many people, including groups that focus on common interests and hobbies. Activities, events, and cell groups can build the connections that are necessary for authentic community.

Virtual third places
Since Oldenburg's writings, there are people in the computer and internet industry that have declared that third places are observed or shifting to the virtual world or virtual third places. This descriptive practice is easily adopted because of the similarities in descriptive characteristics found between the virtual and physical worlds.

In combination with the Industrial Revolution, and as media transitioned from the public space to more comfortable roles inside one's home, there was a large shift away from public activities because they could be enjoyed within the confines of one's home.   With the advent of online technologies, these virtual third places have been observed in online communities. The characteristics observed in these communities vary from their physical application but meet the context of personalization, permeability, approachability, and comfortability.

With the increasing popularity of online multiplayer video games, individuals from across the world are becoming more connected with each other through these video games. The potential for social culture clashes is inherently high considering the large volume of interactions of users from different cultures. However, the online virtual communities constructed within these games share the same characteristics as traditional third places. One of the more prominent features of these communities is the social equalizing aspect. These games allow users to interact through their in-game character, or avatar, which serve as a medium for the player and removes the players' social identifiers. Avatars often interact via built-in text chat systems, allowing users to communicate without revealing their identity through their voice. Therefore, any type of social identification is dependent upon the avatar, not the actual player.

While these online communities provide freedom from traditional social status, that is not to say there are no social hierarchies within the games; each game community constructs their own social norms that determine in-game social status. However, each player begins the game at an equal footing and must achieve social recognition through their in-game accomplishments. The concept of "regulars" within third spaces is also prominent in online gaming communities. These regulars are often identifiable through some type of special identifier; some games include special insignia or titles for accomplished users, making these users stand out to all users. The regulars set standards for accepted in-game behavior, serving as a type of social moderator (especially for new players). For instance, many of these games offer the opportunity for PvP (player vs player) combat, in which users battle against each other. However, this creates an opportunity for users to "grief" one another, which is intentional harassment meant to disrupt gameplay for other users. This type of behavior is often kept in check by the community regulars. "Regular" status is attainable for all users, which furthers the sense of community within the game. As users play more, they are accepted into the community by fellow regulars, forming new social bonds.

As online technologies advance, these online video games become more accessible to individuals across all backgrounds. While these games are often played on traditional video game consoles or on PCs (which often requires purchasing the video game software), there are many internet browser based games (such as RuneScape and Farmville) that allow anyone with internet access to play for free. This widens the variety of individuals that are entering into the community.

Internet access
Many workers in the United States conduct remote work, not from home, but from a third place. Remote work can cause isolation and working in public spaces, such as at Starbucks locations, may be a happy medium between the home office and the corporate office. Availability of public Wi-Fi has been a major enabler of this trend.

A third place which provides internet access may create a hollow effect in that the patrons are physically present but do not make social contact with each other, being absorbed by their remote connections. This is similar to how patrons behave in learning commons environments like those in university libraries where the preponderance of socializing is among people who already know each other. Some businesses, like Nomad Café in Oakland, CA, are trying to ameliorate this effect by staging performance art such as live jazz and asking patrons to share information about themselves with other patrons via an online survey to encourage audience engagement.

Postmodern conception 

Political geographer and urban planner Edward Soja also developed a theory of Thirdspace, in his 1996 book Thirdspace: Journeys to Los Angeles and Other Real-And-Imagined Places. His postmodern conception draws on and is influenced by Henri Lefebvre, Michel Foucault, and postcolonial thinkers Gayatri Chakravorty Spivak, bell hooks, Edward Said, and Homi K. Bhabha. Soja's concept of Thirdspace "breaks the Firstspace-Secondspace dualism and comprises such related concepts as 'place, location, locality, landscape, environment, home, city, region, territory and geography' (50) that attempts to come to terms with the representational strategies of real and imagined places. He proposes a 'trialectics of spatiality' (57) which is a process, a dynamic force and 'recombinational and radically open' (50)."

Fourth and fifth places 

Morisson (2018) argues that places in the knowledge economy are evolving. He argues for the existence of a fourth place. In the knowledge economy, the rise of new social environments is blurring the conventional separation between the first place (home), the second place (work), and the third place. New social environments in the knowledge city can combine elements of the first and second place (coliving); of the second and third place (coworking); and of the first and third place (comingling). Furthermore, the combination of elements of the first, second, and third place in new social environments implies the emergence of a new place, the fourth place.

As the fourth place only works in the normal living mode, during COVID-19 quarantine restrictions, a new hybrid place emerged from the operation of the different outdoor and indoor typologies of other places. This place sometimes works on a physical basis, and other times virtually, with some essential characteristics needed to work properly during the pandemic outbreak. The limit of this place is the attached quarantine semi-private or semi-public space, which can be called "quarantined fourth place" or "fifth place".

See also
Cheers (American TV show)
Coffeehouse (event)
Fiscal localism
Living street
Pub
Third Space Theory
Hybridity
Border
Urban planning
Urban sociology
Urban vitality

References

Works cited

Further reading
 (Hardback)
 (Paperback)

Urban studies and planning terminology
Sociological terminology
Cultural geography
Quality of life